The Saint Mary Spires are the athletic teams that represent the University of Saint Mary, located in Leavenworth, Kansas, in intercollegiate sports as a member of the National Association of Intercollegiate Athletics (NAIA), primarily competing in the Kansas Collegiate Athletic Conference (KCAC) since the 1999–2000 academic year. The Spires previously competed in the defunct Midlands Collegiate Athletic Conference (MCAC) from 1994–95 to 1998–99. Their team colors are navy and gold.

Varsity teams
USM competes in 26 intercollegiate varsity sports: Men's sports include baseball, basketball, bowling, cross country, football, lacrosse, soccer, swimming, tennis, track & field and wrestling; while women's sports include basketball, bowling, cross country, flag football, lacrosse, soccer, softball, swimming, tennis, track & field, volleyball and wrestling; and co-ed sports include cheerleading, dance and eSports.

Facilities

Head Coaches

Conference Championships

Football
Saint Mary began its football program in 2000 under Kevin Haslam and the current coach is Lance Hinson.  As of conclusion of the 2014 season, the school has an all-time record of 34 wins, 68 losses, and 0 ties.

In 2016, The Spire football team won a school record 8 games, capping off the season by beating the #10 Kansas Wesleyan Coyotes.

Softball
In 2001 St.Mary's softball team won the KCAC tournament in their first season in the league.

Cross Country/Track and Field 
The University of Saint Mary Cross Country and Track and Field teams have won 21 KCAC Conference Championships since the inception of the program in 2011-2012. The Spires have an active streak going while winning nine straight KCAC Men's Cross Country Championships from 2013-2021. The Spires are led by Head Cross Country and Track and Field Coach Alstin Benton.

The Spires won the 2020-21 USTFCCCA NAIA Men's Program of the Year Award. The Spires where the only team in the NAIA to finish Top 10 in the Nation in Cross Country, Indoor Track, and Outdoor Track

References

External links